The Gatling Gun originally titled King Gun is a Western shot in 1969 in New Mexico that features then New Mexico Governor David Cargo in a small role. The final film of director Robert Gordon, was not released until 1971.

Plot
Lured by Apache gold, two cavalry troopers desert their post, killing some of their fellow troopers in order to steal a Gatling Gun. The devious two use a pacifist pastor to bring the weapon across the country. A pursuing cavalry patrol kills one of the deserters and captures the other, however the recovered weapon has been made inoperable.

The Apaches, under their chief Two Knife, relentlessly attack the patrol in order to get the Gatling Gun, or "King Gun" as they call it, to use against the soldiers.

Cast
 Guy Stockwell  ... Lieutenant Wayne Malcolm  
 Robert Fuller  ... Trooper Sneed  
 Barbara Luna  ... Leona  
 Woody Strode  ... Runner   
 Patrick Wayne  ... Jim Boland  
 Pat Buttram  ... Tin Pot  
 Carlos Rivas  ... Two Knife  
 John Carradine  ... Reverend Harper  
 Judy Jordan  ... Martha Boland  
 Phil Harris  ... Luke Boland  
 Tommy Cook  ... Trooper Elwood  
 Steve Conte  ... Trooper Mitchell  
 David Cargo  ... Corporal Benton
 Kalai Strode  ... Indian Who Shoots Sneed

See also
 List of American films of 1971

References

External links
 
 

1971 Western (genre) films
1971 films
American Western (genre) films
Western (genre) cavalry films
Films directed by Robert Gordon
Films shot in New Mexico
Films scored by Paul Sawtell
1970s English-language films
1970s American films